Oleg Yesayan (born 12 November 1946) is an Armenian politician and diplomat and is the current Ambassador of Armenia to Russia, presenting his credentials to Russian President Dmitry Medvedev on 5 February 2010.

Yesayan is a former Prime Minister of Nagorno-Karabakh, President of the National Assembly of Nagorno-Karabakh, Chairman of the Securities Commission of Armenia and Ambassador to Belarus.

References

1946 births
Living people
People from Martuni Province
Ambassadors of Armenia to Russia
Armenian diplomats
Politicians from the Republic of Artsakh
Prime Ministers of the Republic of Artsakh
Members of the National Assembly (Artsakh)
State University of Management alumni